St Mary the Virgin's Church, Uttoxeter, commonly called simply St Mary's, is the parish church of the town of Uttoxeter, Staffordshire, England. Its tower and spire were built in the 14th-century; the nave was rebuilt in 1828 and the chancel in 1877. It is a Grade II* listed building.

This is one of two Anglican churches in the parish; the other, also St Mary's, is commonly called "The Heath Mission Church" to avoid confusion.

History
The church was built in the 14th century. By 1828 it was deemed too small so the nave was rebuilt to designs by the architect James Trubshaw. In 1877 the present chancel was built. The chancel was designed by the architect Frederick Josias Robinson of Derby and the contract was Mr. Fryer, also of Derby. The east window was preserved and re-erected in the new chancel, along with its original stained glass. The church re-opened on 29 April 1877.

Administration
St Mary's is the main church in the Deanery of Uttoxeter. It is part of the Uttoxeter Area of parishes along with 
Christ Church, Upper Tean
St Lawrence's Church, Bramshall
St Mary and All Saints' Church, Checkley
St Mary the Virgin's Church, Gratwich
St John the Baptist's Church, Kingstone
All Saints' Church, Leigh
St Peter's Church, Marchington
St John's Church, Marchington Woodlands 
St Michael and All Angels' Church, Stramshall
Heath Mission Church, Uttoxeter

Organ
The pipe organ was built by William Hill & Sons. A specification of the organ can be found on the National Pipe Organ Register.

Bells
The church tower contains a ring of 8 bells. Of these, 6 date from 1729 and were cast by Abraham Rudhall. The treble and tenor were cast in 1874 by John Warner & Sons.

References

Notes

Further reading

External links

Uttoxeter
Uttoxeter
Uttoxeter
Uttoxeter